Chung Sing Lam (born 14 August 1998) is a former Hong Kong professional footballer who played as a centre back.

Honours

International
Hong Kong
 Guangdong-Hong Kong Cup: 2019

External links
Chung Sing Lam at HKFA

1998 births
Living people
Hong Kong footballers
Association football defenders
Hong Kong Rangers FC players
Dreams Sports Club players
Hong Kong Premier League players
Hong Kong First Division League players